Koiak 13 - Coptic Calendar - Koiak 15

The fourteenth day of the Coptic month of Koiak, the fourth month of the Coptic year. On a common year, this day corresponds to December 10, of the Julian Calendar, and December 23 of the Gregorian Calendar. This day falls in the Coptic season of Peret, the season of emergence. This day falls in the Nativity Fast.

Commemorations

Saints 

 The martyrdom of Saint Ammonius, the Bishop of Esna 
 The martyrdom of Saint Behnam and Saint Sarah, his sister 
 The martyrdom of Saints Simeon of Menouf, Abba Hor, and Abba Mina the Elder 
 The departure of Pope Christodoulos, the sixty-sixth Patriarch of the See of Saint Mark 
 The departure of Saint Christodoulos the Anchorite

References 

Days of the Coptic calendar